Crypsicometa is a genus of moths in the family Geometridae.

Species
 Crypsicometa homoema Prout, 1926
 Crypsicometa incertaria (Leech, 1891)
 Crypsicometa ochracea Inoue, 1971

References
 Crypsicometa at Markku Savela's Lepidoptera and Some Other Life Forms
 Natural History Museum Lepidoptera genus database

Baptini